Tracy Yvette Hamlin is an American singer - songwriter, owner of the Sweet Jazz Concert Series, CEO of the independent label, DMH Records, and host of Our Tv Network’s “The Tracy Hamlin Show”. After a stint as lead vocalist for smooth jazz group Pieces of a Dream,Hamlin now performs as a solo artist internationally.  Hamlin has performed as a background vocalist for Gloria Gaynor. Tracy has also arranged vocals for Gaynor’s 2013 album entitled We Will Survive. Tracy Hamlin is a former Vice President of the Washington DC Grammy Chapter and formerly served on the Recording Academy’s National Board of Trustees. Most recently, Hamlin has been appointed Vice Chairperson for Loudoun County’s Visit Loudoun Board of Directors. Hamlin was previously Secretary, Treasurer, and Vice Chairperson of the Visit Loudoun Tourist Board in Loudoun County Virginia.

Solo career
Hamlin released her first album, Seasons, in 2005 for independent label DMH Records. In 2009, Tracy released her second album, Better Days. The album's title song peaked at No. 1 UK Soul Charts.  In 2011, Tracy released a single entitled Drive Me Crazy along with DJ Spen and Quantize Recordings.  Drive Me Crazy made it to number 1 four different times during a four-month period on Traxsource. Tracy went on to release several albums entitled This Is My Life (2013), which also held the No. 1 position on the UK Soul Charts for two weeks, and No Limits (2015) which held the No. 1 position for five weeks on the UK Soul Charts. Since then, she has released dozens of House singles and EP’s such as You Bring Me Joy and Still Need Love, produced by Soulista and Glen Hornsborough respectively.

Sweet Jazz Concerts 

An ongoing project of Hamlin’s called Sweet Jazz Concerts, is a series of Jazz concerts based in Loudoun County Virginia. Sweet Jazz Concerts uses music as a catalyst to give back to the community via music scholarships and donations to local charities such as Loudoun Abused Women Shelter Pearls Empowerment and Students Without Mothers.

DMH Records 

DMH Records is the independent label run by Tracy and is the medium of release for Tracy’s five solo albums. Named after Tracy’s late mother Mrs. Dorothy Marie Hamlin, she runs the label based on the values of her mother.

DMH Artists and affiliated Artists: 
Tracy Hamlin,
Rodney Shelton,
Dalia Reid,
Terry Phillips,
Kevin Jones,
Jarred Armstrong.

The Tracy Hamlin Show 
The Tracy Hamlin Show, hosted by Tracy herself is a weekly talk show that airs mondays at 7:00 pm EST on Our TV Network which is based in Saint Croix and can be viewed on Roku TV, Apple TV, Android TV, Time Warner Cable, Amazon Fire TV, Tempo, 90 Latin Markets on Le Mega Mundial, and OURTV.network. The show consists of two interview segments with a small local business owner, two interview segments of a Music Industry Artist, and a vocal performance by Tracy Hamlin.

Discography

References

External links
 Official Tracy Hamlin Digital website
 Tracy Hamlin's Sweet Jazz Festival website

1966 births
Living people
Songwriters from Maryland
20th-century African-American women singers
Musicians from Baltimore
Singers from Maryland
20th-century American singers
20th-century American women singers
21st-century American singers
21st-century American women singers
African-American songwriters
21st-century African-American women singers